Minervarya nilagirica, commonly known as Nilgiris wart frog, or Nilgiris frog, is a species of frog that is endemic to India.

Description
Minervarya nilagirica has a relatively large size compared to the other species in its genus.

Habitat and distribution
It is found along roadsides and around wetlands excepting wet paddy fields. It is found from Karnataka to Tamil Nadu, and Kerala, in the Western and Eastern Ghats of India, at 800-1600 m elevation.

References

External links

AmphibiaWeb: Information on amphibian biology and conservation

Frogs of India
Fauna of Karnataka
Amphibians described in 2008
nilagirica